Stampede is the only studio album of Concussion Ensemble, released in 1993 by Conc Records. The album was well-received, with The New York Times saying that "Concussion Ensemble showed that stamina and power, more than complexity and originality, are what make ensemble drumming such an invigorating experience."

Track listing

Personnel
Adapted from the Stampede liner notes.

Concussion Ensemble
 Mike Brown – electric guitar
 Rich Cortese – bass guitar
 Larry Dersch – drums
 Terry Donahue – drums
 Rich Gilbert – electric guitar
 Brian Gillespie – drums, sampler (4)
 Ken Winokur – percussion

Additional musicians
 Dana Colley – baritone saxophone (1)
 Fielder George Dowding – bagpipes (4)
 Don Eheman – sampler (4)
 Russ Gershon – tenor saxophone (1)
 Tom Halter – trumpet (1)
 Malcolm Travis – drums (6, 9)
Production and additional personnel
 Carl Plaster – recording, mixing
 George Simian – cover art, photography

Release history

References

1993 debut albums
Instrumental albums